The  Sopwith Admiralty Type C was an early British floatplane designed and built by Sopwith Aviation to drop torpedoes. A single engined tractor biplane floatplane, three were delivered to the Royal Navy in November 1914 but proved unable to lift a torpedo.

Design and development
The Admiralty had ordered a special torpedo carrying biplane (the Sopwith Special torpedo seaplane Type C, serial number 170) in February 1914  and followed it with an order in July 1914 for three similar Type C floatplanes (serial numbers 157, 158 and 159). The specification called for folding wings, bomb gear, a gun and radio. Work started at the Sopwith factory at Kingston-upon-Thames on 5 April 1914 and the three Type Cs, powered by a  Salmson (Canton-Uneé) piston engine, were completed by October.  They went to RNAS Calshot for evaluation in November 1914. The Special, tested that July, had failed to lift a torpedo and the new Type Cs were little better, failing to take off under load: 157 could not get airborne with a  Whitehead torpedo and the other two had similar poor performance. 158 was accepted by the service on 4 February 1915 but it sank following a forced landing a few days later on 8 February. The two survivors, 157 and 159, were withdrawn from service at the end of 1915.

Operators

Royal Naval Air Service

See also

References
Notes

Sources

1910s British military aircraft
Admiralty Type C
Aircraft first flown in 1914